Ballistic, Sadistic is the seventeenth studio album by Canadian thrash metal band Annihilator. It was released via Silver Lining Music and Neverland Music on January 24, 2020, and was produced by group frontman Jeff Waters.

The album was preceded by singles "I Am Warfare" on October 10, 2019, "Psycho Ward" on November 27, "Armed to the Teeth" on December 13 and "Dressed Up for Evil" on January 17, 2020.

Track listing

Personnel
Jeff Waters – vocals, guitars, bass, production, engineering, editing, mixing 
Aaron Homma – lead guitar (track 5)
Fabio Alessandrini – drums

Additional personnel
Angie Waters – voice (track 3) 
Charile Waters – voice (track 3)
Ruby Waters – voice (track 3)
John Gallagher – backing vocals
Kat Shevil Gillham – backing vocals
Rich Gray (formerly Hinks) – engineering, editing
Gyula Havancsak – cover, design, illustration
Maor Appelbaum – mastering engineer
Angie Waters – executive producer, management

Charts

References

2020 albums
Annihilator (band) albums